Kissinger Deng (born 31 May 1979) is a Norwegian ice sledge hockey player. He is a goaltender, and currently plays for  Oslo KHK. He was on the bronze medal team at the 2010 Paralympics and was originally from Sudan.

Titles
2009
Silver at 2009 World Championships
 Gold at Malmø Open

References

External links 
 

1979 births
Living people
Norwegian sledge hockey players
Paralympic sledge hockey players of Norway
Paralympic bronze medalists for Norway
Ice sledge hockey players at the 2010 Winter Paralympics
Medalists at the 2010 Winter Paralympics
Norwegian people of Sudanese descent
Paralympic medalists in sledge hockey